The Missouri House of Representatives is the lower chamber of the Missouri General Assembly. It has 163 members, representing districts with an average size of 37,000 residents. House members are elected for two-year terms during general elections held in even-numbered years.

Missouri's house is the fourth largest in the United States even as the state ranks 18th in population. The only states with a larger lower house in the United States are New Hampshire (400), Pennsylvania (203) and Georgia (180). Republicans have controlled the State House since 2003.

The next election will be held in 2024.

Operations
The Missouri House of Representatives meets annually beginning on the Wednesday after the first Monday in January. A part-time legislature, it concludes session business by May 30. To serve in the chamber, an individual must have attained the age of 24 and have resided in their district for a period of one year preceding the election. State representatives are paid $36,813 per year, with a per diem of $121 per day. The Speaker of the House is the most powerful individual in the chamber, elected by all members of the House. The Speaker makes an additional $2,500 per year in accordance with state law. Representatives are term-limited to a maximum of four terms, or eight years, in the chamber.

Leadership

List of current representatives

Standing committees
These are the yearly recurring committees that hold hearings on legislation filed by Representatives. Once filed, legislation is assigned to one of the following committees by the Missouri Speaker of the House. Legislation is typically assigned to the committee whose province envelopes the subject matter of the bill. However, there are frequently multiple relevant committees to which a bill can be assigned, and it is at the Speaker's discretion to choose which committee receives the bill. Politics can also play a part, as the Speaker may assign a bill to a committee with an unfriendly chair or membership, or may select a more friendly committee.

The partisan makeup of each committee is intended to reflect as closely as possible the partisan makeup of the entire House. Each Party caucus selects which of its members will serve on the Standing Committees, and the chair of each committee is chosen by the Speaker of the House.

Budget committee and subcommittees
Tradition in the Missouri General Assembly is that all appropriations bills initiate in the Missouri House rather than the Senate. So each year, the chair of the House Budget Committee files legislation establishing the spending plan for the state of Missouri. This plan, which in 2007 exceeded $20 billion, may differ greatly from the Governor's budget recommendations, issued at the State of the State address given in late January.

The budget legislation is assigned to the House Budget Committee, which then assigns each bill to its respective subcommittee. After the subcommittee makes its recommendations, the full Budget Committee runs through the entire appropriations package, makes its desired changes, and sends the bill to the full House for consideration.

Joint committees

Joint Committees contain members from both the Missouri House and Senate. These committees may be permanent and study ongoing issues, or may be temporary and intended to come up with suggested legislation to address a one-time issue. The Chair of these committees typically alternates annually between a Representative and a Senator to prevent unfairness to one chamber.

Joint Committee on Administrative Rules
Joint Committee on Capitol Security
Joint Committee on Child Abuse and Neglect
Joint Committee on Disaster Preparedness and Awareness
Joint Committee on Education
Joint Committee on Government Accountability
Joint Committee on the Justice System
Joint Committee on Legislative Research (three subcommittees)
Joint Committee on the Life Sciences
Joint Committee on Public Assistance
Joint Committee on Public Employee Retirement
Joint Committee on Tax Policy
Joint Committee on Transportation Oversight

Term limits
In 1992 Missouri voters approved a constitutional amendment placing term limits on the Missouri House of Representatives. A Representative can serve no more than four two-year terms in the house. The first time term limits prevented someone from running again was in 2002.

Political party strength
Since 2003, the Republican Party has held this chamber of the Missouri General Assembly.

See also
 Missouri Legislature
 Missouri Senate
 Government of Missouri

References

Footnotes

Citations

External links
 Missouri House of Representatives
Publications by or about the Missouri House of Representatives at Internet Archive.

Missouri General Assembly
State lower houses in the United States